Gnophos furvata is a species of moth in the family Geometridae. It is found in southern and central Europe. In the east, the range extends to the Carpathian Mountains and Ukraine.

The wingspan is 38–52 mm. Adults have been recorded feeding on the nectar of Eupatorium cannabinum and Silene species. They are on wing from June to September.

The larvae feed on the leaves of various plants, including Prunus spinosa, Cornus sanguinea, Clematis vitalba, Coronilla coronata and Hippocrepis comosa. The larvae can be found in late summer. The species overwinters in the larval stage. Pupation takes place in June of the following year.

Subspecies
Gnophos furvata furvata
Gnophos furvata cinerascens (Turati, 1919)

References

External links
 Lepiforum.de
 Schmetterlinge-Deutschlands.de

Ennominae
Moths of Europe
Moths described in 1775
Taxa named by Michael Denis
Taxa named by Ignaz Schiffermüller